Malcolm Aitken (c. 1911 – ?) was a college football player.

University of Tennessee
Aitken was a prominent tackle for coach Robert Neyland's Tennessee Volunteers football teams from 1930 to 1932, captain of the 1932 team. After learning coach Neyland's mother had died, Aitken organized a secret meeting with the team, and vowing to "go out and pay a debt of respect and gratitude o one of the greatest coaches football has ever known." The Vols later defeated Florida 32–13. Aitken was selected All-Southern by The Anniston Star. He earned the Torchbearer award in 1933.

Personal life
Aitken married Dorothy Wright on September 24, 1934.

References

American football tackles
Tennessee Volunteers football players
All-Southern college football players